Enno III of Ostfriesland or Enno III of East Frisia (30 September 1563, Aurich – 19 August 1625) was a Count of Ostfriesland from 1599 to 1625 from the Cirksena family. He was the elder son of Count Edzard II of Ostfriesland and his wife Princess Katarina of Sweden, eldest daughter of King Gustav I of Sweden.
 
In 1602 Enno III's troops laid siege to Emden, without success; On 8 April 1603 Enno had to sign the Treaty of The Hague in which he not only accepted the presence of a Dutch garrison in Emden, but agreed to pay the costs for the Dutch garrison. In 1609 the conflict broke out again; the Emders were victorious in a skirmish at Greetsiel and temporarily occupied the Count's residence at Aurich. In 1611 the Dutch garrisoned troops in Leerort. On 24 May the Accord of Osterhusen was signed, which limited the sovereignty of the Count of East Frisia, stated the rights of the Estates (including Emden) and legitimised the Dutch garrison in Leerort.

Family and children
Enno III was married twice. Firstly, he married Countess Walburgis of Rietberg (1556–1586), daughter and heiress of Count John II of Rietberg, Lord of Esens, Stedesdorf and Wittmund and Countess Agnes of Bentheim-Steinfurt. Countess Walburgis, a descendant of Hero Oomkens von Esens, brought the estates of Harlingerland and Rietberg to East Frisia. They had three children:
 Sabina Catherine (11 August 1582 – 31 May 1618), married on 4 March 1601 to her uncle Count John III of East Frisia (1566 – 23 January 1625)
 Agnes (1 January 1584 – 28 February 1616), married on 15 August 1603 to Prince Gundakar of Liechtenstein (30 January 1580 – 5 August 1658)
 John Edzard, (10 May 1586 – 20 May 1586), buried in Esens (St. Magnus)

Countess Walburgis of Rietberg died only few days after her son.  Allegedly she was poisoned.  Stine Essken was burnt at the stake for this.  After the male line of the counts of Rietberg became extinct, the counts of East Frisia became their successor due to the marital connection of Enno III with Walburgis.

On 28 January 1598 Enno III married Anna of Holstein-Gottorp, (27 February 1575 – 24 April 1625), daughter of Duke Adolf of Holstein-Gottorp. They had five children:
 Edzard Gustav (15 April 1599 – 18–19 April 1612)
 Anna Maria (23 June 1601 – 4 September 1634), married on 4 September 1622 to Duke Adolf Frederick I of Mecklenburg-Schwerin.
 Rudolf Christian, Count of East Frisia (25 June 1602 – 17 June 1628)
 Ulrich II, Count of East Frisia (16 July 1605 – 11 January 1648) married on 5 March 1631 Juliana of Hesse-Darmstadt (14. April 1606 – 15. June 1659),
 Christina Sophia (26 September 1609 – 20 March 1658), married on 2 June 1632 to Landgrave Philip III of Hesse-Butzbach (26 December 1581 –28. April 1643).

Ancestors

External links
  Article in the Biographisches Lexikon für Ostfriesland
 Coins of Enno III of Ostfriesland

1563 births
1625 deaths
People from Aurich
Counts of East Frisia